Isomaltose is a disaccharide similar to maltose, but with a α-(1-6)-linkage instead of the α-(1-4)-linkage. Both of the sugars are dimers of glucose, which is a pyranose sugar. Isomaltose is a reducing sugar. Isomaltose is produced when high maltose syrup is treated with the enzyme transglucosidase (TG) and is one of the major components in the mixture isomaltooligosaccharide.

It is a product of the caramelization of glucose.

See also
Isomalt
Isomaltase
Maltose

References

External links

Disaccharides